The Pot of Gold and Other Stories is a collection of children's short stories written by American author Mary Eleanor Wilkins Freeman. First published in 1892 by D. Lothrop Company in Boston, the stories are set in the villages of New England. Hiding beneath the child-friendly narration of these sixteen stories, Wilkins comments on New England village life and the post-Civil war woman.

Contents 
 "The Pot of Gold" - a young girl's ambitious journey leads her to find true treasure
 "The Cow With Golden Horns" - a farm girl's sacrifice for her father ends in reward
 "Princess Rosetta and the Pop-corn Man" - a missing Princess brings back together two dueling Kingdoms
 "The Christmas Monks" - a poor boy's good behavior earns him employment in a magical garden
 "The Pumpkin Giant" - a country terrorized by a monster gets a tasty revenge
 "The Christmas Masquerade" - a costumer's trick on a king's extravagant event betters the lives of children
 "Dill" - a daughter's harmless charm leads to a family reunion
 "The Silver Hen" - a school teachers quest for her missing pet brings two neighbors back together
 "Toby" - the story of a man who marries the wrong woman
 "The Patchwork School" - a new type of reform school is introduced, scaring the children of the town
 "The Squire's Sixpence"- in the quest to do the right thing, a school girl runs into trouble
 "A Plain Case" - an unsuspecting boy is accused of telling a lie
 "A Stranger in the Village" - a royal heir causes excitement within a village
 "The Bound Girl" - a girl is sent to service a family, but her mischief gets her in trouble
 "Deacon Thomas Wales's Will" - a girl grows out of her mischievous ways and becomes a proper young lady
 "The Adopted Daughter" - a new appreciation for each other leads a girl and her guardian to become family

Plot summaries and character lists

"The Pot of Gold"

Plot summary 

"The Pot of Gold" tells the story of the Flower family, who live in a meadow across from a vast green mountain where rainbows frequently form. Within the Flower family are Father and Mother Flower and their seven children, including their oldest daughter Flax Flower. Father Flower is an unappreciated poet who matches all of his children's names with one of their personal traits. Father Flower raises flowers to be sold in market, and each of his flower boxes is arranged so that only flowers with complementary colors and rhyming names are in adjoining beds. The Flowers live in a quaint home surrounded by flowerbeds that the family works hard to maintain. Each of the children takes part in the labor necessary for the upkeep of the flowerbeds, but the eldest daughter Flax Flower takes on the most responsibility. Father Flower and Flax are very close, and he often confides in her that he sometimes wishes he had for more to offer for his family.

While working on the flowers one day, a rainstorm comes through and produces the most beautiful rainbow. Father Flower tells Flax that he wishes he could find the pot of gold at the end of the rainbow. Flax, having never heard of this before, listens while her father tells her of the pot of gold and recites to her the poem he has made about it. Flax insists that if they find the pot of gold, they will be rich and can live a happier life, but Father Flower tells her that it is impossible to find the pot of gold for the rainbow will fade away before they can reach it.

When the next rainbow shows across the river on the mountain, Flax Flower plans how she can reach the large pine tree where the rainbow ends. A few days later, when a shower is suspected after a hot sunny day, Flax sets out to reach the pine tree before the rainbow fades. While searching through the woods, Flax can hear the trees of the forest speaking the same poem her father had shared with her. As the rain starts falling, the trees and leaves grow louder and louder, and as the sun starts shining through the trees, the song is louder than ever and she is surrounded by the colored rays of the rainbow. Flax reaches the tree, and the pot of gold, shining so bright it was almost blinding, and remains even after the rainbow fades. She opens the pot, and instead of being filled with gold and riches, Flax can see the smiling faces of her family at home.

Flax runs home to tell her family what she has seen in the pot of gold. Her father tells her that she is mistaken, for if she found the real pot of gold at the end of the rainbow it would be filled with gold pieces. When Mother Flower hears the story, she tells Flax that she did find the true treasure, and Flax is truly happy even if she didn’t find the real Pot of Gold her father was speaking of. The last line of the story is “But, after all, do you know, I think her father was mistaken, and that she had.”

Characters 

 Flax Flower
 Father Flower
 Mother Flower

"The Cow With Golden Horns"

Plot summary 

“The Cow With Golden Horns” is a story of a farmer and his daughter Drusilla who have a cow with two gold horns. Drusilla and her father live in a small cottage, and Drusilla tends to the cow day and night so that they can sell her precious milk to those eager to buy it. One day, when Drusilla is watching the cow in the meadow, she dozes off and when she wakes the cow is nowhere to be found. Frantically looking for him, Drusilla crosses paths with the King and tells him her story. The king, who had been looking for a suitable daughter to marry to the Prince of Egypt, agrees to help find the cow if she will, in return, come be his daughter. Drusilla agrees to these terms so that her father won’t have to live alone without his cow, and the King promises her that if, within a years time, the cow isn’t found then she will be returned home to her father.

Drusilla is taken to a seminary, learning to make many things for herself and the king and queen. As time passes and the cow isn’t found, rumors start spreading that the gold horned cow never existed, and Drusilla planned this scam to become a princess. In anger, the King sends Drusilla home to her father with nothing. As she arrives at home, the gold-horned cow appears in the meadow carrying baskets of jewels and gold. When the king hears of the cows return, he comes to the cottage to apologize to Drusilla and offers her the princess title once again. Although Drusilla declines the offer to stay with her father, the King and Queen remain very fond of them, build a new castle where their old cottage stood, and name Drusilla  as a countess.

Characters 

 Drussila
 Farmer/Drusilla's Father
 King
 Queen
 Prince of Egypt
 Gold-Horned Cow

"Princess Rosetta and the Pop-Corn Man"

Plot summary 

"i. Princess Rosetta"

“The Princess Rosetta” is the story of a lost princess in the country of Romalia. The king and Queen of Romalia have a daughter, Princess Rosetta, and the three of them are going to the Bee Festival outside of the city on the sixteenth of May. The Bee Festival, which occurs every year, started when the bees migrated across the river from the other Kingdom because they were being treated so poorly. The inhabitants of Romalia, overjoyed to have the bees and delicious honey, treated the bees so well that they have never returned to the kingdom across the river.

At the end of the Bee Festival, the King and Queen return home, with two nurses carrying Princess Rosetta in her basket. Since the baby is so quiet, the nurses deduce that she must be asleep and continue on home. When they return home, the nurses plan to take the baby from her basket and put her straight to bed, without waking her for her nightly routines. The rest of the house workers, however, convince them to wake the baby but when they go to take Princess Rosetta from the basket, she is no longer in it.

"ii. The Pop-Corn Man"

In “The Pop-Corn Man” the whole kingdom goes in search of the missing Princess Rosetta. The king orders for houses to be upturned and every nook and cranny examined for the missing princess, but the search is unsuccessful. The head nurses who were in charge of the Princess on the day of the festival are now forced to walk in shame, wearing their bonnets on backwards covering their faces. One of the head nurses travels to speak with the Baron, who is known for his white magic. The Baron says that the King's court have damaged all of his potions and glasses and he is unable to perform any white magic to find the Princess.

Just then, the Pop-Corn man knocked at the door and brings in his popcorn to sample. When the Pop-Corn man hears that the Princess was missing, he states that he will rescue the princess and takes a group of 6 boys across the river to the other Kingdom to sell his popcorn. The King across the river loves the popcorn, declares it the new food of the Kingdom, and sets his people to work growing, popping, and eating the corn. This constant popping of corn, however, tires out the Kingdom and when the King of Romalia hears that his daughter is across the river, he is able to lay siege to the city successfully to rescue the Princess. The Princess, in the end, marries the son of the King across the river, and as a wedding present the King of Romalia gives a beautiful beehive. Both kingdoms live peacefully, with their own bees, honey, and popcorn.

Characters 

 King of Romalia
 Queen of Romalia
 Princess Rosetta
 Head Nurses
 King across the River
 Baron
 Young Prince
 Pop-Corn Man

"The Christmas Monks"

Plot summary 

“The Christmas Monks” is a story of a poor boy named Peter and how he gets the opportunity to work in the garden of the Christmas Monks. The Christmas Monks live in a convent and grow a garden full of Christmas presents every year. All of the children look in awe at the convent, and one day the Monks post a sign looking for two good boys to come work in the garden. They question all of the boys in the kingdom, but most are dismissed because they have done something bad in their lives. The two boys that are chosen are Peter, the poor boy, and the Prince. While the Prince hates the work in the garden and is always being punished, Peter is enamored and loves tending to and watching the presents he planted grow.

One day, nearly at Christmas time, the Prince escapes from the convent, and unsuccessfully tries to bring a sack of presents with him. This same day, Peter's younger, disabled sister sneaks into the garden. Peter, afraid of doing wrong, tells her she can stay but has to camouflage herself as one of the wax dolls in the garden that did not grow that season. When she is discovered by a Monk, the girl is brought to the Holy Abbot and presented as a miracle, for they think she is a wax doll that has come alive where no doll had grown before. The Abbot cures her of her lameness, and on Christmas Day the Monks all line up to worship their miracle with presents. The young girl speaks out and tels the truth about being Peter's sister. The Abbot insists that even if she isn’t the miracle they thought, she is still a miracle in her own way and the Monks continue their presentation of gifts. Peter and his sister return home, and Peter remains an employee of the garden. The Prince, although he is still adored and loved, is sad for he didn’t receive any Christmas presents that year.

Characters

 Peter
 The Prince
 The Christmas Monks
 The Holy Abbot
 Peter's Sister

"The Pumpkin Giant"

Plot summary

“The Pumpkin Giant” is a story of how one family saves their country from a monster known as the Pumpkin Giant. In this country, there are no pumpkins and only potatoes are grown in the fields. The Pumpkin Giant is a terrible creature who eats fat little girls and boys. The King and Queen of this country have a daughter, Princess Adriadne Diana, who is the fattest child in the country. The King is so frightened that she will be eaten that 50 guards are always protecting her. Due to his growing fear, the King issues a statement saying that he will knight whoever cuts of the head of the Pumpkin Giant and kills him, but the town reasons that they were all too afraid and unable to kill him.

There is a family that lives not far from the castle of the Pumpkin Giant. Patroclus and Daphne fear for their son, Æneas, who is just as fat as the Princess. One day, Patroclus and Æneas are outside picking potatoes when the Pumpkin Giant comes towards them trying to eat Æneas. Patroclus throws a large potato into the mouth of the Giant, killing him. The family then cuts off the head of the Giant and Æneas uses it as a toy for some time. After the death of the Pumpkin Giant, pumpkin heads begin to sprout in fields all over the country, and everyone fears that they will soon have hundreds of Pumpkin Giants roaming about. The pumpkin heads stop growing, however, and only the faceless "heads" emerge from the earth. Æneas is very curious about how things taste, and one day takes a bite of a pumpkin head in his yard. It is the most delicious thing he has ever tasted, and soon his family begins cooking the pumpkin heads in different ways. As Daphne is making pies one day, the King rides by and tastes them. He falls in love with the pies and knights Patroclus on the spot for killing the Pumpkin Giant. The whole family moves into the King's castle so Daphne can bake pies for the whole kingdom and Æneas can marry Princess Adriadne Diana.

Characters

 The Pumpkin Giant
 The King
 Princess Adriadne Diana
 Patroclus
 Daphne
 Æneas

"The Christmas Masquerade"

Plot summary

“The Christmas Masquerade” is the story of a Costumer who disrupts the everyday life of a city. On Christmas Eve, the Mayor is putting on a Christmas Masquerade for all of the children in the town, rich and poor. He is even offering to pay for the costumes of the less fortunate children. A new Costumer has shown up in town, offering the most beautiful costumes. The rich children go to the ball dressed as shepherdesses and chimney sweeps and goose girls while the poor children dress as princesses and fairies. After the extravagant party, the happy children head home but as their parents try to remove their costumes they find that the clothing keeps fixing itself and will not come off. The next morning, after letting the children sleep in their costumes, the parents still can’t remove the clothing. Even worse, the children truly believe that they are the character they’re dressed as. Soon the wealthy children are running around trying to tame their geese and sweep chimneys while the poor children are making demands as if they were princesses and fairies.

The Mayor, concerned for his own daughter who believes she is a goose girl, calls a meeting with the Aldermen and decide that they must ask the Wise Woman how to return the children to normal. The Wise Woman tells them to first feed them castor oil, and when that doesn’t work to spank them and send them to bed without super, but neither of these work and the men insult her and leave. Violetta, the eldest daughter of the Mayor who is concerned for her younger sister, asks the Cherry-man if he knows how to help. The Cherry-man tells her that the Costumer is living up in one of his cherry trees, and the townspeople head there to find him. Despite their riots and attempts to cut the Costumer from the tree, the townspeople are unsuccessful.

The Costumer agrees to return their children to normal after his two demands had been met: first, the mayor must throw the masquerade party every year and fill the stockings of the poor children with presents, and second, the Cherry-man must be permitted to marry Violetta. Reluctantly, the Mayor agrees to the demands of the Costumer and all of the children return to their normal selves. Violetta is married to the Cherry-man and the masquerade continues each year.

Characters

 The Mayor
 The Mayor's Youngest Daughter
 Violetta
 Costumer
 Cherry-Man
 Aldermen
 Wise Woman

"Dill"

Plot summary

“Dill” is the story of Dame Clementina and her long lost father. Dame Clementina has a daughter, Nan, who one day picks a sprig of dill. Her mother tells her of the tale that if you hang a sprig of dill over your door, it will freeze anyone who is ill-willed or envious of you before they can enter the house. Now, Dame Clementina is the count's daughter, but when she marries a poor lowly dairyman she is disinherited from her father. While he gives her silver milk pans and a beautiful dairy, she doesn’t see him for many years and he has never met his granddaughter Nan. One day, Dame Clementina finds that Nan had hung the sprig of dill over their front door, but the Dame insists to Nan that no one is envious of them. But just then, Dame Goulding comes walking up the path and is stopped by the curse for she envied Dame Clementina and her milk pans. Nan runs to get Dame Goulding's husband, but he too is stopped by the curse for envying Dame Clementina's white cow. More and more people try to enter the house but are stopped by the curse and soon the yard is full of people screaming to be released. Finally, the Count rides to the house and is stopped on his horse for he envied Dame Clementina for having a child like Nan.

Nan and Dame Clementina take care of these people the best they can, providing them with food and fire and umbrellas to protect them from the rain. Eventually, Dame Elizabeth comes to the house and is permitted to enter for she was not envious of either of the two. She suggests that they simply take down the dill from the door, and when they do, the people in the yard scurry away freely. The Count, however, remains and just as he is reprimanding Dame Clementina he recognizes her as his own daughter. The Count offers to rewrite Dame Clementina and Nan into his will and invites them to live with him at the castle.

Characters

 Dame Clementina
 Nan
 Dairyman
 Dame Goulding
 Dame Elizabeth
 The Count

"The Silver Hen"

Plot summary

“The Silver Hen” is a story of Dame Penny and how she finds her lost silver hen. Dame Dorothea Penny is a schoolteacher and teaches twelve children out of her house. She has a beautiful silver hen that goes missing from a pad locked coop in her backyard one day. Dame Louisa, who lives next door to Dame Penny, has the most beautiful Christmas trees that line the path in her front yard. Every year, the Christmas trees sprout with strands of popcorn, fruit, candy, and wax candles. This season, however, they are dead and Dame Louisa blames the silver hen.

When Dame Penny tells her school children that the hen is missing, they are all terribly sad and she gives them permission to search for her. After searching for three weeks, the children go to Dame Louisa and ask if she knew where they should look. Dame Louisa tells the children to look in the White Woods, which are dangerous and so cold that no one can ever venture in. While Dame Penny is out looking for the hen, the children descend into the woods calling for her. It soon becomes dark and the Snow Man comes out from the woods, frightening the children and telling them that there is no hen here but they should come back to his house for his wife will love the company. When they get to the house, the Snow Man's family is so happy to see the children, but they insist that the children are hot and keep giving them cold food and fans to keep cool. After being shown their bedroom, the children wait until the house is quiet and then try to escape only to find that the Snow Man's wife has placed an icicle in the lock and they cannot leave.

In the village, the parents of the children are in a panic and Dame Louisa knows that the Snow Man and his wife must have the children. She goes to Dame Penny and tells her what she did and the two of them head into the woods to get the children. When they arrive at the Snow Man's house, they rescue the children but as they are riding back out of the woods the Snow Man comes blowing after them, claiming them are stealing his company. Dame Louisa lights her bonnet on fire to scare the Snow Man and they exit the woods safely. When they return home, the Christmas trees in Dame Louisa's yard have returned to their beautiful selves and the silver hen, along with twelve silver chickens, are waiting in Dame Penny's yard.

Characters

 Dame Penny
 Dame Louisa
 Twelve School Children
 The Silver Hen
 The Snow Man
 The Snow Man's Wife and Children

"Toby"

Plot summary

“Toby” is the story of Uncle Jack's recount of Toby, an old feeble black man who lived in Pokonoket and had a loon. Aunt Malvina, while sitting with Uncle Jack and Letitia, starts talking about Toby, Pokonoket, and the loon while she waits for her car to come and pick her up. When Aunt Malvina leaves, Letitia asks Uncle Jack for the story of Toby and Pokonoket and the loon, and he tells her this story.

Pokonoket was a very dark country, one where the people were required by law to have squeaky sneakers and phosphorescent buttons on their clothes and phosphorescent names on their umbrellas. All of this was necessary so that you could see someone coming towards you. The people of Pokonoket were peaceful and rarely committed crimes. There once was an Ogress who lived in the darkness somewhere in Pokonoket and ate anyone that she could catch. Toby was a widower who spent all of his days making soup and knitting stockings for his grandchildren. Toby also had arthritis, and therefore couldn’t keep up with the knitting and the soup making, so he went in search of a widow, Mrs. Clover-Leaf, to ask for her hand in marriage so she could assist him in making soup for his grandchildren.

When Toby arrived at the widow's house, it was dark and his lantern was out, but he asked her to marry him and she said yes. The two went to the ministers house, were married, and then returned home to begin making soup for the grandchildren returning from school that afternoon. As Toby lit his lantern again, however, he saw that he didn’t marry Mrs. Clover-Leaf and instead was wed to the Ogress herself. Scared for the lives of his grandchildren, Toby ran to the minister and asked for his help. The minister followed Toby home and, by showing the Ogress her own face in a mirror, killed her. The real Mrs. Clover-Leaf accepted Toby's offer of marriage and spent her time making soup while Toby knitted stockings for his grandchildren. After hearing the story, Letitia continues on with her patchwork.

Characters

 Aunt Malvina
 Uncle Jack
 Letitia
 Ogress
 Toby
 Minister
 Mrs. Clover-Leaf

"The Patchwork School"

Plot summary

“The Patchwork School” is a story about a city that implicates a new type of reform school for troubled children. There is a benevolent woman with a large amount of money who wants to develop a place for children that misbehave for their parents and are ungrateful or unhappy. A special form of police officer patrols the streets looking for children who appear to be complaining or misbehaving. The woman who started this school, however, doesn’t want the children to be beaten or mistreated so instead she enlists the help of an old woman to watch over the children while they sew patchwork, thus dawning the name of the Patchwork School for this institution. The old woman suggests that the children sit and sew patchwork all day long, having to look longingly outside the windows at freedom. Most all children in the city have spent some time in the Patchwork school, except for one boy, Julia.

While Julia has many reasons to complain about his life, he has yet to be sent to the Patchwork School. Julia, with four grandmothers, spends his days looking for their missing spectacles or chasing the balls of yarn that they drop on the floor. Every Christmas, Julia receives two pairs of knitted stockings from each of his grandmothers, and they all get hung up on the mantle for Christmas morning. While Julia wishes that his grandmothers could get him another present, his wish never comes true. So after Christmas one day, Julia goes outside to cry about his presents. When a stranger asks him “what’s the mater” Julia spills his whole story about the stockings and his grandmothers and before he knows it the special police are carting him off to the Patchwork School.

While Julia is sewing his patchwork one day, the Mayor and the Chinese Ambassador decide to visit the Patchwork School. After staying longer than they expected, the two gentlemen try to leave but as the Ambassador is exiting the door it shuts, for it is time to close the school for the night, and the Ambassador's hair is closed inside it. Since the door cannot be opened again until morning, Julia is asked to sit and tell stories to the Ambassador to help pass the time. Upon hearing why Julia is in the Patchwork School, the Mayor and the Ambassador have him released and when Julia returned home he finds the eight stockings from his grandmothers hanging on his mantle filled with presents and treats.

Characters

 Benevolent Lady
 Patchwork Woman
 Julia
 Four Grandmothers
 Mayor
 Chinese Ambassador

"The Squire's Sixpence"

Plot summary

 “The Squire’s Sixpence” is a story of a little girl trying to do the right thing. Patience Mather, a young student, is in class one day doing her multiplication table when Squire Bean enters the classroom to observe. The Squire makes Patience very nervous, and she struggles to complete the problem of seven times eight. As the class continues and other children struggle, Patience gets to the head of the arithmetic class. After recess, the students come back into the classroom and Squire Bean gives out two sixpences, one of which goes to Patience for being the head of the arithmetic class. Patience, however, heard the answer to her math problem from another student, but when she tries to give the sixpence back to Squire Bean he says she should keep it for she is an “honest and truthful child”(Wilkins 226)

One day, Patience’s mother asks her to travel to a neighbor’s house, Nancy Gookin, but patience is afraid to go by herself and instead enlists the help of her friend, Martha Joy. Martha Joy has a toothache and doesn’t want to go with Patience, but Patience offers to spend a sixpence she has from her uncle on peppermints for Martha. When Patience goes to buy the candy, she is unable to find the sixpence. Martha calls Patience a liar for not bringing her candy and both girls go back to class crying. During recess, Patience heads to the store and uses her sixpence from Squire Bean, which was intended as a bookmark, to buy the peppermints for Martha.

Patience knows she wasn’t supposed to spend that sixpence, and one day a worker from Squire Bean’s house, Susan Elder, comes to tell Patience that the Squire wants to see her. After telling Martha the true story of the sixpence she used to buy the peppermints, Patience travels to the Squire’s house. The Squire’s wife tells Patience not to be worried, that the Squire won’t yell, and when she tells Squire Bean the story of what happened, the Squire actually laughs. The sixpence is returned to Patience as a bookmark again and Patience leaves the Squire’s house after eating a large piece of plum-cake with the Squire’s wife.

Characters

 Patience Mather
 Martha Joy
 Teacher
 Squire Bean
 Susan Elder
 Squire's Wife

"A Plain Case"

Plot summary

“A Plain Case” is the story of Willy Norton, a sweat, shy boy, who's vacationing with his grandparents and is accused of a crime that he did not commit. Willy, who had never traveled away from his mother, goes with Grandma and Grandpa Stockton to visit Aunt Annie and his new Uncle Jack in Exeter. Willy spends his days with Uncle Jack, and wishes he could stay just a little longer in Exeter.

The day before they are scheduled to go home, Grandma and Grandpa Stockton tell Willy that they are going to stay a few more days for Grandma and Grandpa Perry's silver wedding. Uncle Jack sends home for Grandpa Stockton's jacket and Willy's shoes, and when they arrive Grandma Perry gives them to Willy to bring home to his Grandfather. When Willy gets home that night and Grandma Stockton asks for the coat, Willy claims he never had the coat.

After being punished for multiple days for lying, Grandma and Grandpa Stockton decide to take Willy home to his mother, Ellen Norton, to see if she can get the truth out of him about where he brought the jacket. One night while talking over what to do with Willy, Aunt Annie and Uncle Jack burst through the door telling the story of how Grandma Perry gave the package to the wrong boy and acknowledge that Willy was telling the truth the whole time. Willy is adorned and loved more so than ever after this. The last line of the story says “Innocence and truth can feel the shadow of unjust suspicion when others can no longer see it.”

Characters

 Willy Norton
 Ellen Norton
 Father Norton
 Grandpa and Grandma Stockton
 Grandpa and Grandma Perry
 Aunt Annie
 Uncle Jack

"A Stranger in the Village"

Plot summary

“A Stranger in the Village” recounts the story of Margary and Lord Lindsay's son and his days as a stranger in the village. One day, while gathering water for her mother's porridge, Margary runs into her two friends insisting that she come at once to see the beautiful carriage parked at the tavern. Reaching the tavern, Margary sees the most beautiful boy, with blonde curls and a little white dog. When Margary returns home with the pitcher, she begins telling her mother about the boy she saw when he suddenly appears, standing outside their door. The little boy comes inside and has a meal with Margary and her mother, and then continues on his way. Everyone in the town is talking about the stranger they saw yesterday, identifying his as a Lindsay because of his love of butter, as proven by a test done from the eldest woman.

Two days later and after the excitement had settled a bit, a poor beggar boy with his dirty dog comes trudging through the village, stopping at every door to ask for help. Every door that had previously been open for Lord Lindsay's son was closing in the face of the beggar. When the poor boy reaches Margary's house, she and her mother both curtsy and welcome him into their home, recognizing immediately that he was in fact Lord Lindsay's son. The boy tells the story of how his carriage, shortly after leaving the village, was attacked and robbed. Margary and her mother care for the boy until his father, Lord Lindsay, arrives to take his son home. Margary, sad to see this beautiful boy leave, becomes the pride of the village and Lord Lindsay's son comes back to marry her.

Characters

 Margary
 Margary's Mother
 Eldest Woman
 Lord Lindsay's Son/Beggar Boy/Stranger in the Village
 Lord Lindsay

"The Bound Girl"

Plot summary

“The Bound Girl” is the first of three stories about Ann Ginnins, the apprentice to Samuel Wales and his wife Polly. Ann Ginnins is a young girl, who is sent by her mother to the Wales family as their apprentice for a term of sixteen years, three months, and twenty-three days. Ann, a five-year-old, travels fourteen miles from Boston and arrives at the Wales residence. When she arrives, Ann is very ungrateful and sad to be there, and refuses to answer any of Mrs. Wales's questions. Ann, having dark black curly hair and black eyes, is not what Samuel Wales and his wife had expected of their bound girl. Ann is also acute, and watches carefully as Samuel places her papers, binding her to this family, in his desk drawer and locks it.

As time passes, Samuel Wales and his wife begin realizing that they have their hands full with Ann, as she is very mischievous.  Mrs. Deacon Thomas Wales, Samuel Wales’ mother, shows kindness to Ann and always took a liking to her. She, unlike Mrs. Polly, feels that Ann should be out enjoying her childhood instead of doing work around the house all day.

Ann attends a school for three months of the year, and while there she meets a friend, Hannah French, and when she asks Mrs. Polly one day if she can go ice skating with Hannah and gets told no, Ann gets very angry. After Samuel Wales and his wife leave, Ann takes her papers from the desk drawer where they were locked in and runs away. Ann runs to Hannah French's house, drops off her doll, and tells Hannah of her plan. As Ann ran as fast as she could down the Boston Road, Captain French, who is informed by Hannah of Ann's plan, swoops her and returns her to the Wales residence. Scared for the repercussions of her actions, Ann saunters into the kitchen only to find it still empty. She places her papers back in the desk, never to disturb them again. Deacon Thomas Wales dies, and grandma requests that Ann come stay with her to heal her loneliness.

Characters

 Ann Ginnins
 Samuel Wales
 Polly Wales
 Margaret Burgis
 Mrs. Deacon Thomas Wales
 Hannah French
 Captain French

"Deacon Thomas Wales's Will"

Plot summary

“Deacon Thomas Wales’s Will” is the second of three stories about Ann Ginnins, the apprentice to Samuel and Polly Wales. In the will of Deacon Thomas Wales, he leaves to his wife Sarah the Southwest fire-Room of his house as well as the privilege to retrieve water from the well and to bake in the oven whatever she might need. To his sons Ephraim and Atherton he leaves his homeplace, but Ephraim already has a good home of his own so Atherton and family move into the house alone. Mrs. Dorcas, Atherton's wife, is eager to increase her status by moving into this beautiful house but is disturbed by the fact that she can’t use the Southwest room for herself. Grandma doesn’t approve much of Mrs. Dorcas and is nervous to share a home with her, but as she is her youngest son's wife, she gives in.

Ann comes to live with grandma, despite the hesitations of Samuel Wales and his wife, but Mrs. Dorcas is not very fond of her for she thinks that Grandma should pay more attention to her real granddaughter, the baby Thirsey. Throughout their time in the house together, Ann and Mrs. Dorcas don’t get along and Ann's mischievous side shines through a bit. One day, Ann ruins all of Mrs. Dorcas's hand-made candlewicks, and is scolded by Grandma and instructed to stay home from work and school until she made this up to Mrs. Dorcas.

That night, Thirsey becomes very sick but there is no one to fetch the doctor. Ann, brave as she is, runs through snow and sleet and travels four and a half miles to retrieve the doctor for Thirsey. After recovering from her treacherous journey in the cold, Ann returns home to Grandma and Mrs. Dorcas to find out that Thirsey has been saved. Thinking that Ann saved her baby's life, Mrs. Dorcas is kind to Ann for the rest of her stay with Grandma.

Characters

 Ann Ginnins
 Deacon Thomas Wales
 Atherton Wales
 Ephraim Wales
 Mrs. Dorcas
 Grandma Sarah Wales
 Thirsey

"The Adopted Daughter"

Plot summary

“The Adopted Daughter” is the third and last story of Ann Ginnins, the apprentice of Samuel Wales and his wife Polly. After the death of Samuel Wales, Ann returns home to Mrs. Polly and wants to help her in any way she can. Two gentlemen take the inventory of Samuel Wales’ will, and it proves to be a task that Mrs. Polly can’t bear. Ann, feeling sorry for Mrs. Polly, steals Samuel's jacket hanging behind the door so it won't be quantified for monetary value like the rest of his belongings. Hearing that the collectors would be very upset if they missed something, Ann rushes to the house of one of them, Mr. Silas White, and presents him with the jacket that he has missed.

Shortly after, Grandma passes away and Ann again belongs to Mrs. Polly. Although Ann mourns the death of Grandma, things in Mrs. Polly's house are much better than the last time she left and she can’t help but cheer up. Over the next couple of years, Ann becomes more of a daughter to Mrs. Polly and less of a servant, and one day Mrs. Polly asks Ann for permission to adopt her. Ann agrees wholeheartedly and her name changes officially from Ann Ginnins to Ann Wales.

One night after dinner, Captain French comes to the door of Mrs. Polly's house and asks if either of them have seen Hannah, for she's been missing since she left for her aunt's house the day before. Ann, determined to find her best friend Hannah, heads off towards Bear Swamp to search for her. So she doesn’t get lost, Ann leaves bits and pieces of wool cards stuck to trees to mark her path. Calling Hannah's name out loud, Ann soon finds Hannah, who had gotten lost in the woods. The two begin to climb out of the woods, but soon Hannah tires too much and can no longer walk. Ann leaves Hannah and rushes to get help. When Ann comes back, she is leading a cow for Ann to ride home. Hannah rides the cow home and is returned to her father. Ann is returned to an overjoyed Mrs. Polly.

Characters
 Ann Ginnins/Ann Wales
 Mrs. Polly Wales
 Grandma Wales
 Captain French
 Hannah French
 Mr. Silas White

Themes 
In these stories Wilkins deconstructs gender roles and feminist theory while commenting on the realism of the New England society at the time. Some major themes include:
 The destructive nature of women
 The intricacies of New England village life (Westbrook, 69,70)
 Poverty Stricken
 Lonely and wearisome
 Strangeness of independence within society and the struggle to achieve it
 Post-Civil war world of women creating despair in a withering market of men
 The aspiration to achieve more within society, both socially and economically (“The Pot of Gold”, “The Cow With Golden Horns”, “The Patchwork School”)
 The injustices of the world as perceived by a child (“The Patchwork School”, “The Bound Girl”, “The Christmas Monks”)

Critical reception 
Unlike many of Wilkins’ other works, The Pot Of Gold and Other Stories received very little review and critique. Coming at a time where she had just finished one of her more infamous books of short stories, A New England Nun and Other Stories (1891), and was in the process of writing one of her novels, these children's stories seemed to prove unimportant for the scholar reader (Westbrook 33). Perry D. Westbrook says of her children's stories, "None of these works are read today, mainly because she created in them no compellingly lifelike characters…Classics for children are even rarer than those for adults” (Westbrook, 33).

In “A Jury of Her Peers” Elaine Showalter acknowledges that The Pot of Gold received very little attention, stating that “hiding submissive material in the category of children’s literature was one way to escape censure” (Showalter, 237). In her critique of “The Patchwork School” Showalter brings to light Wilkins’ exploration of the destructive nature of women and the issues surrounding the feminist movement (Showalter, 195), highlighting the reform school requiring bad children to complete patchwork tasks that women and girls carried out in their everyday lives (Showalter, 237).

Sales 
In the article “Mary Wilkins Freeman: One Hundred Years of Criticism” Mary Reichardt references the audience of Wilkins's short stories, stating that while her female audience was implied, there was also a widespread male audience as well. Reichardt states, however, that after World War 1, the feminist movement collapsed and the sales of Wilkins's work plummeted (Reichardt, 35).

References 

 Foster, Edward. Mary E. Wilkins Freeman. New York: Hendricks House, 1956. Print.
 Freeman, Mary Eleanor Wilkins. The Pot Of Gold and Other Stories,. Boston: D. Lothrop, 1892. Open Library. Web. 15 May 2012. <https://archive.org/stream/potofgoldandothe00freerich#page/n5/mode/2up>.
 Reichardt, Mary R. "Mary Wilkins Freeman: One Hundred Years of Criticism." Legacy 4.2 (1987): 31-44. University of Nebraska Press. Web. 5 May 2012. <https://www.jstor.org/stable/25678998>.
 Showalter, Elaine. "Mary Wilkins Freeman." A Jury of Her Peers: American Women Writers from Anne Bradstreet to Annie Proulx. New York: Alfred A. Knopf, 2009. 196+. Print.
 Westbrook, Perry D. Mary Wilkins Freeman,. New York: Twayne, 1967. Print.
 Wilkins, Mary Eleanor Wilkins. The Pot Of Gold and Other Stories. Boston: D. Lothrop, 1892. Print.

Children's short story collections
1892 short story collections
American short story collections
Short story collections by Mary E. Wilkins Freeman
1890s children's books